Mantle Branch is a stream in Clark County in the U.S. state of Missouri. It is a tributary of the Fox River.

Mantle Branch has the name of John Mantle, an early settler.

See also
List of rivers of Missouri

References

Rivers of Clark County, Missouri
Rivers of Missouri